Madeleine Guerin (born 25 October 1999) is an Australian rules footballer playing for the Carlton Football Club in the AFL Women's (AFLW). 

Guerin was drafted by the Melbourne Football Club with their second selection and fourteenth overall in the 2017 AFL Women's draft. 

She made her debut in the six point win against  at Casey Fields in the opening round of the 2018 season.

Following the conclusion of the 2020 season both Guerin and fellow Demon Elise O'Dea were traded to the Carlton Football Club in exchange for Pick 15 in the 2020 NAB AFLW Draft.

Statistics
Statistics are correct to the end of Round 1 of the 2021 season. 

|- style="background:#EAEAEA"
| scope="row" text-align:center | 2018
| 
| 22 || 1 || 0 || 0 || 4 || 1 || 5 || 0 || 1 || 0.0 || 0.0 || 4.0 || 1.0 || 5.0 || 0.0 || 1.0 || 0
|- 
| scope="row" text-align:center | 2019
| 
| 22 || 3 || 0 || 1 || 17 || 7 || 24 || 4 || 7 || 0.0 || 0.3 || 5.7 || 2.3 || 8.0 || 1.3 || 2.3 || 0
|- style="background:#EAEAEA"
| scope="row" text-align:center | 2020
| 
| 22 || 2 || 0 || 0 || 1 || 4 || 5 || 0 || 1 || 0.0 || 0.0 || 0.5 || 2.0 || 2.5 || 0.0 || 0.5 || 0
|-
! scope="row" style="text-align:center" | 2021
||
| 18 || 1 || 0 || 1 || 7 || 0 || 7 || 2 || 1 || 0.0 || 0.0 || 7.0 || 0.0 || 7.0 || 2.0 || 1.0 || 0
|- class="sortbottom"
! colspan=3 | Career
! 7
! 0
! 1
! 29
! 12 
! 41
! 6	 
! 10
! 0.0 
! 0.1 
! 4.1 
! 1.7  
! 5.9 
! 0.9 
! 1.4 
! 0
|}

References

External links 

1999 births
Living people
Melbourne Football Club (AFLW) players
Australian rules footballers from Victoria (Australia)
Northern Knights players (NAB League Girls)
Darebin Falcons players
Carlton Football Club (AFLW) players